The 1995 South American Championships in Athletics were held in Manaus, Brazil between 26 and 28 May.

Medal summary

Men's events

Women's events

Medal table

External links
 Men Results – GBR Athletics
 Women Results – GBR Athletics

S
South American Championships in Athletics
A
International athletics competitions hosted by Brazil
1995 in South American sport
1995 in Brazilian sport